Rita Moreno is a Puerto Rico-born American actress, dancer, and singer. Throughout her career spanning almost 80 years, she has appeared in numerous film, television, and theater projects. Moreno's notable acting work includes supporting roles in the golden age of Hollywood musical films Singin' in the Rain (1952), The King and I (1956) and West Side Story (1961). She continued acting in films such as Popi (1969), Carnal Knowledge (1971), The Four Seasons (1981), I Like It Like That (1994) and the cult film Slums of Beverly Hills (1998). In 2021, she played Valentina in Steven Spielberg's film adaptation of West Side Story.

She is also known for her work on the children's television series The Electric Company (1971–1977) as well as a supporting role as Sister Peter Marie Reimondo on the HBO series Oz (1997–2003). She voiced the titular role of Carmen Sandiego in Where on Earth Is Carmen Sandiego? from 1994 to 1999. From 2017 to 2020, she portrayed the role of the matriarch Lydia Margarita del Carmen Inclán Maribona Leyte-Vidal de Riera in the 2017 remake of One Day at a Time. For theater, she is best known for her role as Googie Gomez in The Ritz for which she received a Tony Award. She also starred in a female revival of The Odd Couple (1985–86) alongside Sally Struthers and Tony Shalhoub.

Filmography

Film

Source: Internet Movie Database & Turner Classic Movies

Television

Source: Internet Movie Database & Turner Classic Movies

Theatre 

Source: Internet Broadway Database

References

External links 
 
 
 
 

Actress filmographies